Juan García Larrondo (born 1965) is a Spanish playwright born in El Puerto de Santa María, Cádiz Province.

References

External links 

   Personal website

1965 births
Living people
People from El Puerto de Santa María
Spanish dramatists and playwrights
Spanish male dramatists and playwrights